Lenos Trigeorgis is the Bank of Cyprus Chair Professor of Finance in the School of Economics and Management, University of Cyprus. He is considered a leading authority on capital budgeting and strategy, having pioneered the field of real options, and having authored several books on related topics.

He has taught at many of the world's top universities including Boston University, MIT, Columbia University, UC Berkeley, London Business School, and the University of Chicago. He has published in numerous journals, and serves on the editorial boards of several journals. He is also President of the Real Options Group (ROG), a boutique strategy consulting firm focusing on real options valuation. Every year since 1997, ROG has organized the Annual International Conference on Real Options.

Prof. Trigeorgis  is the author of Real Options  (MIT Press, 1996) and co-authored Strategic Investment (Princeton University Press, 2004), and Competitive Strategy (MIT Press, 2012).  With Michael Brennan, he edited Project Flexibility, Agency, and Competition (Oxford University Press, 1999), and, with Eduardo Schwartz, Real Options and Investment Under Uncertainty (MIT Press, 2001).

He received his D.B.A. from Harvard University in 1986.

References

External links
Profile, University of Cyprus
Profile, Real Options Group
Faculty Profile, London Business School
SSRN Author Page

Living people
Harvard Business School alumni
Massachusetts Institute of Technology faculty
Columbia University faculty
Haas School of Business faculty
University of Chicago faculty
Financial economists
Real options
Year of birth missing (living people)
Academic staff of the University of Cyprus